Kami Rita (born 17 January 1970, Thame, Solukhumbu District, Nepal is a Nepali Sherpa guide who, since May 2018, has held the record for most ascents to the summit of Mount Everest. Most recently, he scaled the mountain for a 26th time on 7 May 2022, breaking his own record set on 7 May 2021. His father was among the first professional Sherpa guides after Everest was opened to foreign mountaineers in 1950. His brother Lakpa Rita, also a guide, scaled Everest 17 times.

In 2017, Kami Rita was the third person to ascend to the summit of Everest 21 times, sharing this record with Apa Sherpa and Phurba Tashi Sherpa. The latter two subsequently retired.

On 16 May 2018, at age 48, Kami Rita became the first person in the world to climb Everest 22 times, achieving the record of the most summits on the 8,850-meter (29,035-foot) peak. In April of the year, he told the news media that he planned to scale Everest 25 times before retirement, "not just for myself but for my family, the Sherpa people and for my country, Nepal"; He completed his 26th summit of Everest on 7 May 2022.

Kami Rita currently holds the record for most 8,000 meter summits, with 38 total. In addition to his Everest completions, his totals include Cho-Oyu eight times, three times on Manaslu, and both Lhotse and K2 once each.

Career
According to Kami Rita's brother Lakpa Rita, Kami's first work on a mountain was in 1992, assisting a Base Camp cook. Another report, however, states that he was already working as a porter, transporting gear to the Everest base camp, at age 12. By age 24, he had scaled Everest.

In 2018, Kami Rita told a journalist that the government does not support the Sherpas. "We are famous around the world. Many foreigners know us, but our government doesn’t care about us." He said that when Ang Rita Sherpa was hospitalised in Kathmandu in 2017 after a brain haemorrhage the government provided no support. Although climbing is safer than in the past because of superior equipment and weather forecasts, the occupation is still dangerous, he told a reporter in 2018. (the 2014 Mount Everest ice avalanche killed 16 Sherpas; in 2015, 10 Sherpas died at the Everest Base Camp after the avalanches in the wake of the April 2015 Nepal earthquake. In total, 118 Sherpas have died on Everest between 1921 and 2018.) "The crevasses are deep and the slopes are unpredictable," Kami Rita said. An April 2018 report by NPR stated that Sherpas account for one-third of Everest deaths.

In 2018, Kami Rita was earning about $10,000 for each Everest climb because of his extensive previous experience. The highest peaks in Nepal are safe only around May of each year; in the autumn, he guides clients up the country's smaller peaks.

As of May 2019, he was employed by Seven Summit Treks, a company that arranges climbing expeditions. Prior to 2018, he had been employed by an American firm, Alpine Ascents International.

From August 2019, he has served as a Brand Ambassador and the Chief Adventure Consultant of Himalayan Glacier Adventure and Travel Company. He has no plans to retire as long as his body is physically able to handle the climbing.

Kami Rita Sherpa is also a brand ambassador for a cement product, Brij Super Premium OPC, manufactured in Nepal.

There is also another Kami Rita Sherpa who works on Everest and had completed his 16th summit in 2017 with Adventure Consultants.

Kami Rita summited Everest on 7 May 2021, breaking his own record with his 25th ascent, and again summited Everest on 7 May 2022, breaking his own record with his 26th ascent.

Personal life
Kami Rita was born and grew up in Thame, a small village in the Solukhumbu district of Nepal, living with his large family in a one-room house. Thame is also the birthplace of other famous mountaineering Sherpas, including Tenzing Norgay who (alongside Sir Edmund Hillary) achieved the first ascent of Mount Everest in 1953. In his youth, he had considered becoming a monk and spent some time at the Thame Dechen Chokhorling monastery but decided not to proceed with this vocation.

A 2018 report stated that Kami Rita lives with his wife, Lakpa Jangmu, and two children in Kathmandu. He has ensured that his children are getting an education to enable them to choose occupations that are less dangerous than guiding mountaineers. "We were illiterate and poor and there were no other means of survival [back then]. As a result, we were compelled to climb dangerous mountains to eke out a living," he told a journalist.

In another 2018 report, Lakpa Jangmu is quoted as saying that she wished that her husband would retire from mountaineering. "I keep telling him we could look for other jobs, start a small business. But he does not listen to me at all." She also confirmed that their children will not become mountain guides.

Everest expeditions 
Expedition timeline:
 1994 : Summited on 13 May, via S Col - SE Ridge as High Altitude Worker
 1995 : Reached up to 8500m as High Altitude Worker
 1997 : Summited on 25 May, via S Col - SE Ridge as Climber
 1998 : Summited on 25 May, via S Col - SE Ridge as High Altitude Worker
 1999 : Summited on 13 May, via S Col - SE Ridge as High Altitude Worker
 2000 : Summited on 23 May, via S Col - SE Ridge as High Altitude Worker
 2002 : Summited on 25 May, via S Col - SE Ridge as High Altitude Worker
 2003 : Summited on 30 May, via S Col - SE Ridge as High Altitude Worker
 2004 : Summited on 24 May, via S Col - SE Ridge as High Altitude Worker
 2005 : Summited on 30 May, via S Col - SE Ridge as High Altitude Worker
 2006 : Summited on 20 May, via S Col - SE Ridge as High Altitude Worker
 2007 : Summited on 22 May, via S Col - SE Ridge as High Altitude Worker
 2008 : Summited on 24 May, via S Col - SE Ridge as High Altitude Worker
 2009 : Summited on 5 May (Rope fixing team) and 23 May, via S Col - SE Ridge as High Altitude Worker
 2010 : Summited on 5 May (Rope fixing team) and 24 May, via S Col - SE Ridge as High Altitude Worker
 2012 : Summited on 18 May, via S Col - SE Ridge as High Altitude Worker
 2013 : Summited on 10 May (Rope fixing team) and 22 May, via S Col - SE Ridge as High Altitude Worker
 2015 : No summit bid due to the Earthquake
 2016 : Summited on 20 May, via N Col - NE Ridge as High Altitude Worker
 2017 : Summited on 27 May, via S Col - SE Ridge as High Altitude Worker
 2018 : Summited on 16 May, via S Col - SE Ridge
 2019 : Summited on 15 May, via S Col - SE Ridge
 2019 : Summited on 21 May, via S Col - SE Ridge
2021: Summited on 7 May, via S Col - SE Ridge
2022: Summited on 7 May, via S Col - SE Ridge

See also
 List of Mount Everest summiters by number of times to the summit
 List of 20th-century summiters of Mount Everest
 Lhakpa Sherpa
 Phurba Tashi

References

Sherpa summiters of Mount Everest
People from Solukhumbu District
20th-century Nepalese people
21st-century Nepalese people
1970 births
Living people